Aconitum henryi is a species of flowering plant in the buttercup family known by the common name Sparks variety monkshood.

Description

It has glossy dark green divided leaves, the surfaces are glabrous or adaxially sparsely appressed pubescent. The stem is long with far-spaced flowers. The sepals are blue or deep violet-blue. The flowering period extends over the months of September and October. The fruits are pod-like follicles. Aconitum henryi is poisonous due to the presence of alkaloids.

This species is often cultivated. There are different varieties.

Taxonomy
It was found in China and then first described and published by German botanist Ernst Georg Pritzel in Bot. Jahrb. Syst. (Botanische Jahrbücher für Systematik) Vol.29 on page 329 in 1900.

It was verified by United States Department of Agriculture and the Agricultural Research Service on 18 February 1998.

Distribution
This wildflower is native to China, (within the provinces of Gansu, Henan, Hubei, Hunan, Shaanxi, Shanxi, Sichuan and Zhejiang) where it grows in forests and scrubs in mountainous areas ( above sea level).

Conservation
It is considered a plant of least concern on the 'Asia Red List' of plants based on the IUCN Red List.

References

External links

henryi
Taxa named by Ernst Pritzel
Flora of China
Garden plants of Europe
Plants described in 1900